This page is intended to help distinguish between locations referred to as "Excelsior Mill" and may refer to:

 Cedarburg Wire and Nail Factory previously known as Excelsior Mill
 The Masquerade (Atlanta) previously known as DuPre Excelsior Mill